Tariq bin Taimur (30 June 1921 – 28 December 1980) was a member of the Omani royal family who became president of the Council of Ministers (prime minister) of Oman.

Tariq was a son of Sultan Taimur bin Feisal, the ruler of the Sultanate of Muscat and Oman from 1913 to 1932. Another son of Taimur, Said, ruled the country from 1932 to 1970. In 1970 Said was overthrown by his son Qaboos. The new sultan changed the name of the country to be simply the Sultanate of Oman. He named his uncle Tariq as prime minister. Tariq held the position for two years until 1972. He was the chairman of Central Bank of Oman from 1975 to 1976. 

Tariq's daughter Nawal was married to Qaboos from 1976 to 1979. Tariq died in 1980. After Sultan Qaboos died in 2020, one of Tariq's sons, Haitham, became Sultan.

Family
Tariq was the son of Taimur bin Feisal, Sultan of Muscat and Oman, by the Circassian Kamile İlgiray. Tariq had four brothers, Said, Majid, Fahr and Shabib, and one sister. His first marriage was to Shawana bint Hamud bin Ahmad Al Busaidiyah. They had seven sons, Talal, Asa'ad, Haitham, Qais, Shihab, Adham and Faris. Tariq later married a relative, Shawana bint Nasir Al Said. They had two daughters, Amal and Nawal. Nawal married Tariq's nephew Sultan Qaboos in 1976, but they divorced in 1979.

Three of Tariq's sons were likely candidates to succeed Qaboos. Asa'ad bin Tariq became Deputy Prime Minister for International Relations and Cooperation as well as representative to the Sultan. Shihab was a commander in the Royal Navy of Oman. Haitham served as Minister of Heritage and Culture. After Qaboos died on 11 January 2020, Haitham was named as his successor.

Ancestry

References 

1921 births
1980 deaths
20th-century Omani people
Al Said dynasty
People from Muscat, Oman
Sons of Omani sultans
Omani expatriates
Expatriates in the Ottoman Empire